Nioro Cercle is an administrative subdivision of the Kayes Region of Mali.  Its administrative center (chef-lieu) is the town of Nioro du Sahel. The commune is on the Mauritanian border and has long been a major stop on the trans-Saharan trade.  

The cercle is divided into 16 communes:

 Baniéré Koré
 Diabigué
 Diarra
 Diaye Coura
 Gadiaba Kadiel
 Gavinané
 Gogui
 Guétéma
 Koréra Koré
 Nioro du Sahel
 Nioro Tougouné Rangabé
 Sandaré
 Simbi
 Trougoumbé
 Yéréré
 Youri

References

External links
.

Cercles of Mali